The South Australian Railways 720 class was a class of 2-8-4 steam locomotives operated by the South Australian Railways.

History
The 720 class were built by the South Australian Railways as an improved version of the 710 class locomotives. The initial order was for five locomotives. They were intended to operate on the lighter broad gauge lines, but after they began to spread rails, they were confined to the heavier lines. A further twelve were built between 1938 and 1943. The final twelve differed in having streamlined valances and boiler lagging tinwear. Coal shortages after World War II saw 14 converted to burn oil. All were later converted back to coal burners. The last were withdrawn in April 1960.

References

External links

Railway locomotives introduced in 1930
720
2-8-4 locomotives
Broad gauge locomotives in Australia
Freight locomotives